Souffian El Karouani (born 19 October 2000) is a professional footballer who plays as a left back for Eredivisie club NEC. Born in the Netherlands, he represents the Morocco national team.

Career
El Karouani played in the youth teams of TGG, Den Bosch, BVV, Elinkwijk and NEC.

NEC

2019–20 season 
In 2019, he was promoted to NEC's first team. He made his debut for the club on 9 August 2019, in the home match against FC Eindhoven which was lost 1–2. El Karouani came on as a substitute for Anthony Musaba in the 68th minute. On 2 July 2020, he signed a one-year contract with NEC which included an option on another season.

2020–21 season 
In the 2020–21 season, he became the starting left back in an attacking NEC led by head coach Rogier Meijer. On 3 October, El Karouani scored his first goal for the club in the home game against FC Eindhoven, which was won 6–0. On 23 May 2021, El Karouani won promotion to the Eredivisie with NEC, by beating NAC Breda 1–2 in the final of the play-offs. He provided the assist to the winning goal by Jonathan Okita, which meant that the club returned to the highest Dutch division after an absence of four year. He finished the season with 43 appearances in which he scored 3 goals, and his 8 assists were the most in the team.

International career
Born in the Netherlands, El Karouani is of Moroccan descent. He debuted with the Morocco national team in a 3–0 2022 FIFA World Cup qualification win over Guinea-Bissau on 9 October 2021.

Career statistics

References

External links
 
 

2000 births
Living people
Sportspeople from 's-Hertogenbosch
Footballers from North Brabant
Moroccan footballers
Morocco international footballers
Dutch footballers
Dutch sportspeople of Moroccan descent
Association football defenders
FC Den Bosch players
USV Elinkwijk players
NEC Nijmegen players
Eerste Divisie players
Eredivisie players
2021 Africa Cup of Nations players